The West Bengal Joint Entrance Examinations Board is the state government administered authority established by Government of West Bengal. It conducts Common Entrance Examinations for admission to undergraduate and postgraduate Professional, Vocational and General Degree Courses in the state of West Bengal, India. It conducts the West Bengal Joint Entrance Examination annually.

Examinations 
Following examinations are organised by WBJEEB every year.
 WBJEE
 PUBDET
 PUMDET
 EVETS
 JELET
 JENPAUH
 JECA
 JEHOM
 JEEDEC
 JESNU

References

1962 establishments in West Bengal
Education in West Bengal
Educational boards based in Kolkata
State agencies of West Bengal